Wimal Kumara de Costa (4 July 1948  – 20 November 2016 as විමල් කුමාර ද කොස්තා [Sinhala]) was an actor in Sri Lankan cinema. One of the most popular comedy artists in 1980s and 1990s, he started cinema career with character roles in art films where he later moved to comedy roles in cinema. He is cited as the pioneer of Sri Lanka mime industry.

Personal life
Wimal Kumara De Costa was born on 4 July, 1948 in Kelaniya, and he completed his education from Gurukula College, Kelaniya.

Career

Early days
Before entering popular art, he acted many regional stage shows like Andare, Yakage Kamhala, Sith Peraliya and Diyasena. Costa began his mainstream acting career while attending Gurukula College with a role in the play Godo Enakath directed by A.J Selvaduray. Subsequently, he performed in plays such as Dunna Dunna Gamuwe, Hitha Hondha Ammandi, Puttu, Kavuruth Yan Ne, Kora Saha Andhaya and Nattukarayo by W. Jayasiri, Sugathapala de Silva and others.

His first experience with film came with a role in Dharmasena Pathiraja's short Sathuro (1969). His first feature was also a Pathiraja film, Ves Gaththo, released the next year. The Pathiraja collaboration would continue through the rest of the 1970s and early 1980s, yielding some of Wimal's most famous roles such as the socialist in Bambaru Awith (1978), the abusive youth in Eya Dan Loku Lamayek (1977) and the disaffected youth of Ahas Gauwa (1974).

Costa won the Award for the Best actor at 1963 Theatre Drama Festival for the acting in Dunna Dunna Gamuwe.

Mime art
Costa is highlighted as the pioneer of Sri Lankan mime art. His most notable miming acts are Pemwathaa, Chaaya Roopa Shilpiya, Charlie Chaplin, Inimaga, Magiyek and Adare Wedana. These acts were made by dramatists like Gamini Haththotuwegama, Dharmasena Pathiraja, Sarath Kallepotha and Bandula Vithanage.

Gaining Popularity
His critically acclaimed performances in these films led to him becoming a much sought after actor for character roles by other art directors. Sunil Ariyaratne too used him as a whiskey seller in Sarungale (1979) among other roles. Gamini Fonseka featured him in most of his directorial work such as Sagarayek Meda (1981).

In the 1980s, de Costa began to take lighter roles which he had occasionally done in the 1970s to a much smaller extent. This would be the period he began to get lead roles in such films as Silva and Jivithayen Jivithayak.

From the 1990s on he had done mainly small comedic roles in B-movies.

Death
De Costa attended Colombo South General (Teaching) Hospital on 19 November 2016, where he died next day by intense respiratory difficulties.

Filmography
 No. denotes the Number of Sri Lankan film in the Sri Lankan cinema. De Costa has acted in more than 100 films ranging from drama, action, and comedy roles.

References

External links 
Sri Lanka Sinhala Films Database - Wimal Kumara de Costa

1948 births
2016 deaths
Sri Lankan Roman Catholics
Sinhalese male actors
Sri Lankan male film actors